Live and Acoustic is a limited edition EP by the Canadian hard rock band Harem Scarem, performing songs from their self-titled album and their second studio album either acoustically or in live performance, the latter having been recorded at a concert on January 22, 1994 in Toronto, Ontario.

Track listing

Band
Harry Hess – lead vocals, guitar, producer.
Pete Lesperance – lead guitar, backing vocals, producer.
Mike Gionet – bass, backing vocals.
Darren Smith – drums, backing vocals.

1994 EPs
Harem Scarem albums
Warner Music Group EPs